S86 may refer to:
 S86 (Berlin), a S-Bahn line
 S86 (New York City bus) serving Staten Island
 Blériot-SPAD S.46, a French airliner
 Expressway S86 (Poland)
 
 Sky Harbor Airport (Washington), in Snohomish County, Washington, United States